Zybin is a Russian masculine surname, its feminine counterpart is Zybina. Notable people with the surname include:

Aleksandr Zybin (1951–2010), Russian Olympic sailor
Galina Zybina (born 1931), Russian former track and field athlete and coach

Russian-language surnames